Bob Stutt is a Canadian puppeteer and writer, who has starred in various children's television programs throughout his career.

Filmography

Television
 Today's Special (1981) – Mort
 Fraggle Rock (1983) – Several characters, including Wander McMooch and Felix the Fearless
 The Muppets: A Celebration of 30 Years (1986) (uncredited) 
 Under the Umbrella Tree (1986) – writer and puppeteer of Iggy Iguana
 Basil Hears a Noise (1990) – Additional puppeteer
 The Big Comfy Couch (1992–2006) – Molly, Wuzzy Dust Bunny, Snicklefritz
 Sesame Park (1996–2001) – Basil
 Ruffus the Dog (1998–1999)
 Caillou (2000) – Gilbert the Cat

Writer
 Theodore Tugboat (1993–1995) (10 episodes)

References

External links 

Year of birth missing (living people)
Canadian children's writers
Living people
Canadian puppeteers
Fraggle Rock performers
Canadian male voice actors
Place of birth missing (living people)